is a railway station located in the city of Izu, Shizuoka Prefecture, Japan operated by the private railroad company Izuhakone Railway.

Lines
Shuzenji Station is the southern terminal station of  the Sunzu Line, and is located 19.8 kilometers from the northern terminus of the line at Mishima Station.

Station layout
The station has two island platforms serving four tracks. Tracks 1 and 2 are used for local service only; Tracks 3 and 4 are used for both local and limited express Odoriko services. The station building has both a staffed service counter and automatic ticket machines.

Platforms

Adjacent stations

|-
!colspan=5|Izuhakone Railway

History 
Shuzenji Station was opened on August 1, 1924 as part of the final extension of the Sunzu line from

Passenger statistics
In fiscal 2017, the station was used by an average of 2378 passengers daily (boarding passengers only).

Surrounding area
 Izu City Hall
 Shuzen-ji onsen
 Kano River

See also
 List of Railway Stations in Japan

References

External links

 Official home page

Railway stations in Japan opened in 1924
Railway stations in Shizuoka Prefecture
Izuhakone Sunzu Line
Izu, Shizuoka